Keith Graydon (born 10 February 1983) is an Irish footballer who plays for Morpeth Town as a midfielder and a striker.

Club career
Born in Dublin, County Dublin, Graydon was a member of the Home Farm youth system before joining English club Sunderland on a professional contract on 28 February 2000. He joined Third Division side York City on a one-month loan on 27 March 2003. His debut came on 29 March 2003 after starting York's 2–0 defeat at home to Southend United. In the following game, a 2–2 home draw with Rochdale on 12 April 2003, Graydon scored his first and only goal for York with a 35th minute penalty kick. Graydon finished the loan spell at York with one goal in seven appearances, and in May 2003 he was released from his Sunderland contract.

Graydon went on trial with Football Conference side Scarborough before signing on non-contract terms on 25 September 2003. He signed a contract for the rest of the 2003–04 season the following month and made his debut for the club as an 82nd-minute substitute in a 2–1 home win over Port Vale in the Football League Trophy on 14 October 2003. Having made four appearances for Scarborough, Graydon signed for Northern Premier League Premier Division outfit Blyth Spartans on 29 March 2004. He left for league rivals Spennymoor United in September 2004.

Having joined Washington Nissan in April 2005, Graydon signed for Dunston Federation in July. He signed for Northern Premier League Premier Division club Gateshead in October 2005, making his debut on 22 October in a 3–2 home win over Ashton United. He finished the 2005–06 season with 24 appearances before leaving Gateshead for Durham City in the summer of 2006. He scored seven Northern League Division One goals in the 2007–08 season before joining Sunderland RCA in the summer of 2008, where he was made captain.

Graydon signed for Sunderland RCA's Northern League rivals Jarrow Roofing in October 2008. However, during the following month he signed for Northern Premier League Division One North outfit Newcastle Blue Star. Graydon re-signed for Durham in March 2009, with manager Lee Collings praising his impact at the club, saying "We've hopefully come out of a little blip and re-signing Keith Graydon has made a big difference. He ran the show against Radcliffe". He left for Spennymoor Town in the summer of 2009 and scored 12 goals in the Northern League Division One in the 2009–10 season. Graydon scored the winning goal for Spennymoor in the 2013 FA Vase Final at Wembley Stadium on 4 May 2013 with a powerful shot from eight yards 10 minutes from full-time, as the side beat Tunbridge Wells 2–1. In November 2014 he signed for Morpeth Town, who he captained to another FA Vase win in 2015–16.

International career
Graydon was capped by the Republic of Ireland under-16s and under-18s before playing for the under-20s during the 2002–03 season.

Style of play
Graydon plays as a midfielder and a striker.

Career statistics

Honours
Spennymoor Town
FA Vase: 2012–13
Morpeth Town
FA Vase: 2015–16

References

External links

1983 births
Living people
Association footballers from Dublin (city)
Republic of Ireland association footballers
Republic of Ireland youth international footballers
Association football midfielders
Association football forwards
Home Farm F.C. players
Sunderland A.F.C. players
York City F.C. players
Scarborough F.C. players
Blyth Spartans A.F.C. players
Spennymoor United F.C. players
Sunderland Nissan F.C. players
Dunston UTS F.C. players
Gateshead F.C. players
Durham City A.F.C. players
Sunderland Ryhope Community Association F.C. players
Jarrow Roofing Boldon Community Association F.C. players
Newcastle Blue Star F.C. players
Spennymoor Town F.C. players
Morpeth Town A.F.C. players
English Football League players
National League (English football) players
Northern Premier League players
Northern Football League players